Claes Cronstedt (born 1943 in Stockholm, Sweden) is an international lawyer and member of the Swedish Bar. He is one of the pioneers on Business and Human Rights.

Biography 

Claes Cronstedt is a former International Partner of Baker & McKenzie Law Firm. He was the head of the Corporate Practice Group in the Stockholm office and the leader of M&A transactions. He founded the Stockholm Corporate Social Responsibility (CSR) Practice Group. Cronstedt and served as arbitrator as well as counsel in international arbitrations and involved in international Human Rights litigation, in particular, the Raoul Wallenberg Case against USSR.

2001–2014 Cronstedt was a member of the working-group of experts of the Council of Bars and Law Societies of Europe CCBE which is i.a publishing guidelines (position papers) for EU's 1.000.000 lawyers on how to advise in Corporate Social Responsibility (http://www.ccbe.eu/index.php?id=94&id_comite=54&L=0for). He was the co-founder and member of the Advisory Board of the Swedish Amnesty International Business Group and since 2003 member of the Geneva International Committee of Human Rights Watch. From 2001 until 2004 he was a member of the Swedish Committee of the ICC Commission on Business in Society, engaged in drafting a Guidebook on Responsible Business Conduct. He was a trustee 1999–2006 of International Alert, London, committed to the peaceful transformation of violent conflict. 2006–2009 he was a member of the International Commission of Jurists ´ Expert Legal Panel on Corporate Complicity in International Crimes. As from 2009 he is a member of Gaemo Group International, a think-tank on corporate responsibility.

Claes Cronstedt was the founder and chairman 1999–2004 of the Raoul Wallenberg Academy for Young Leaders (raoulwallenberg.se) and the chairman 2003–2015 of The Non-Violence Project , combating youth violence. He was a member of the board of the Stockholm Bar Association 1993–1998, member of the board of the Swedish Federation of Service Industries 1992–1998 and Chairman of the Swedish Marine Industries Federation, SWEBOAT 1986–1995. During 1992–1998 Claes Cronstedt was the Vice Commodore and Honorary Secretary of the Royal Swedish Yacht Club.

Claes Cronstedt is a frequent speaker and writer since mid nineties on the subject of Business and Human Rights. In 2013 he initiated a project to create the first ever International Arbitration Tribunal on Business and Human Rights. The strategy is to look beyond existing national court systems and regulatory mechanisms that have largely failed to provide accountability for business related human rights abuses worldwide – http://www.l4bb.org/pages/advert.php?advertiser=tort_tribunal. Cronstedt was the keynote speaker about an International Arbitration Tribunal on Business and Human Rights at United Nations Annual Forum in Geneva, December 2014, http://business-humanrights.org/en/binding-treaty/proposals-for-intl-tribunal-on-corporate-liability-for-human-rights-abuses.

References
The following individuals have provided advise on the proposal of an International Arbitration Tribunal on Business and Human Rights:

Yousuf Aftab, Principal, Enodo Rights.
Roger P. Alford, Associate Dean for International and Graduate Programs and Professor of Law, Notre Dame Law School.
Ian Binnie, former Justice of the Supreme Court of Canada.
William Bourdon, Avocats au Barreau de Paris.
Douglass Cassel, Notre Dame Presidential Fellow and Professor of Law.
Jan Eijsbouts, former General Counsel and Director of Legal Affairs of AkzoNobel, is Professor of Corporate Social Responsibility and Professorial Fellow at the Institute for Corporate Law, Governance and Innovation Policies at the Faculty of Law, Maastricht University.
Elise Groulx Diggs, Associate Tenant Doughty Street Chambers, Principal, BI for Business Integrity & Partners (Washington, DC), Convenor ABA Center for Human Rights Advisory Board Business & Human Rights Project.
Jonathan Kaufman, Legal Advocacy Coordinator, EarthRights International.
Errol P. Mendes, Professor, Common Law Section, University of Ottawa.
Tamar Meshel, Associate, Enodo Rights.
Peter Muchlinski, Professor of International Commercial Law, School of Law, SOAS University of London.
Gabriela Quijano, Business and Human Rights Legal Adviser, Global Thematic Issues, Amnesty International.
Steven R. Ratner, Bruno Simma Collegiate Professor of Law, University of Michigan Law School. 
Suzanne Spears, Wilmer Cutler Pickering Hale and Dorr LLP.


 

Dagens Industri 
http://translate.google.ch/translate?hl=en&sl=sv&u=http://www.di.se/artiklar/2001/3/30/foretagens-fredsrorelse-lundin-gjorde-fel-i-sudan/%3Fflik%3Dsenaste&prev=search   
Human Rights and Business Country Guide 
http://hrbcountryguide.org/2014/10/intl-arbitration-tribunal-on-business-human-rights-could-be-a-new-way-to-offer-victims-access-to-fair-justice-says-claes-cronstedt/            
Affärsvärlden 
http://translate.google.ch/translate?hl=en&sl=sv&u=http://www.affarsvarlden.se/affarsjuridik/kronika/article2554393.ece&prev=search  
ESCR-Net 
http://www.escr-net.org/docs/i/707019 
Peace Palace Library 
http://www.peacepalacelibrary.nl/plinklet/index.php?ppn=341343269   
International Law Association (ILA)
http://translate.google.ch/translate?hl=en&sl=sv&u=http://www.ilasweden.se/evenemang/page/3/&prev=search    
Globe Award 
https://web.archive.org/web/20160528205439/http://www.climatewell.com/Documents/Awards/Globe_Award_2007.pdf
International Commission of Jurists (ICJ)
https://web.archive.org/web/20160303225646/http://www.fes-globalization.org/geneva/documents/ICJ_5Oct06/Participants.pdf          
European Coalition for Corporate Justice (ECCJ)
https://web.archive.org/web/20160305000948/http://www.corporatejustice.org/corporate-complicity-in%2C395.html
Dalai Lama attends peace seminar in Stockholm 1997
http://www.tibet.ca/en/library/wtn/archive/old?y=1997&m=6&p=16_1

1943 births
Living people
20th-century Swedish lawyers
Claes
21st-century Swedish lawyers